Kanman (貫満 1793 – 1859) was a Japanese netsuke carver of the Iwami school (founded by Seiyōdō Tomiharu). 

Most of his work was designed in the first three decades of the 19th century. According to collector Anne Hull Grundy, "His netsuke [...] are extremely rare."

In the historical kana orthography he was spelled "Kwanman" (くゎんまん). It can also be pronounced  as "Tsuramitsu" (貫満). He is also known to sign as "(Iwami-no-)Kuni" (石見国).

References

Bibliography 
 Earle, Huthart, p. 270, no. 239.
 Lazarnick, NIA, p. 590.
 Rokusho 20, p. 50, no. 63.
 Earle, Huthart, p. 280, no. 249.
 Burditt, ICK, p. 51, figs. 8a-8b.
 Rokusho 20, p. 45, no. 54.
 Earle, Huthart, p. 262, no. 231.

External links
 Bonhams : A buffalo-horn netsuke of a beetle on a nasubi (aubergine) By Tsuramitsu (Kanman, 1793-1859), Iwami Province, first half of the 19th century
 Bonhams : A buffalo-horn netsuke of a rat on a bamboo shoot By Kanman (1793-1859), first half of the 19th century
 Bonhams : A kurogaki (black persimmon) wood netsuke of a crab on driftwood By Kanman (1793-1859), Iwami Province, early 19th century

Japanese sculptors
19th-century sculptors
Netsuke-shi